Mutsalaul (Musalavul) is a rural locality (a selo) in Khasavyurtovsky District, Republic of Dagestan, Russia. The population was 6,760 as of 2010. There are 103 streets.

Geography 
Mutsalaul is located 18 km northeast of Khasavyurt (the district's administrative centre) by road. Bayramaul is the nearest rural locality.

References 

Rural localities in Khasavyurtovsky District